Ossi Saarinen (born December 9, 1986 in Helsinki, Finland) is a Finnish professional ice hockey forward. He is currently playing for Danish club, IC Gentofte in the Metal Ligaen. Saarinen joined Gentofte on a one-year contract after playing three seasons with KalPa in the Finnish Liiga on September 4, 2014.

References

External links

1986 births
Living people
Finnish ice hockey left wingers
Jokerit players
KalPa players
Ice hockey people from Helsinki